This is a list of diplomatic missions of Lithuania, excluding honorary consulates.

Lithuania and the other Baltic states, together with the Nordic countries have signed a memorandum of understanding on the posting of diplomats at each other's missions abroad, under the auspices of Nordic-Baltic Eight.

Current missions

Africa

Americas

Asia

Europe

Oceania

Multilateral organizations

Gallery

Closed missions

Americas

Asia

Europe

See also
 Foreign relations of Lithuania
 List of diplomatic missions in Lithuania
 Visa policy of the Schengen Area

Notes

References

External links
 Ministry of Foreign Affairs of the Republic of Lithuania

 
Lithuania
Diplomatic missions